Room for Two is a 1940 British comedy film directed by Maurice Elvey and starring Frances Day, Vic Oliver and Greta Gynt. The film was written by Gilbert Wakefield, based on his 1938 stage farce. The film's Italian setting was overtaken by events, as by the time of its release Fascist Italy had entered the Second World War against Britain.

Plot summary
The story takes place in Venice, where a womanising Englishman Vic Oliver takes a strong interest in a married tourist who is played by Frances Day. Oliver disguises himself in drag and gets himself hired as the Days' maid. When Day's philandering husband, played by Basil Radford, shows up, the fun starts.

Cast
 Frances Day as Claire Spencer 
Vic Oliver as Michael Brent 
 Hilda Bayley as Madame Mignon 
 Greta Gynt as Hilda Westby
 Basil Radford as Robert Spencer 
 Rosamund Greenwood as Grace
 Magda Kun as Mimi
 Leo De Pokorny as Hotel Manager  
 Gleniss Mortimer as Maria
Victor Rietti as Gaston 
 Maureen Pryor as Mary
 Andreas Malandrinos as Gondolier

Critical reception
Allmovie wrote, "when Day's philandering hubby Basil Radford comes home, the laughs start rolling in."

References

Bibliography
 Chibnall, Steve & McFarlane, Brian. The British 'B' Film. Palgrave MacMillan, 2009.

External links
The New York Times Movies

1940 films
1940s English-language films
Films directed by Maurice Elvey
1940 comedy films
British comedy films
Films set in Venice
British black-and-white films
1940s British films